Supraorbital refers to the region immediately above the eye sockets, where in humans the eyebrows are located. It denotes several anatomical features, such as:

Supraorbital artery
Supraorbital foramen
Supraorbital gland
Supraorbital nerve
Supraorbital ridge
Supraorbital vein